Děhylov is a municipality and village in Opava District in the Moravian-Silesian Region of the Czech Republic. It has about 800 inhabitants.

Geography
Děhylov lies near Ostrava in the eastern tip of the Nízký Jeseník mountain range. It is located on the right bank of the Opava River, which forms the municipal border. In the eastern part of the municipality there is Štěpán fish pond, protected together with its surroundings as a nature reserve.

History
The first written mention of Děhylov is from 1464. The settlement was founded between 1377 and 1400.

Notable people
Alois Honek (1911–2002), violin maker
Zdeněk Návrat (born 1931), ice hockey player

References

External links

Villages in Opava District